Nelson Ruiz (born 25 May 1949) is a Venezuelan boxer. He competed in the men's light welterweight event at the 1968 Summer Olympics.

References

1949 births
Living people
Venezuelan male boxers
Olympic boxers of Venezuela
Boxers at the 1968 Summer Olympics
Sportspeople from Maracaibo
Light-welterweight boxers